Karel Struijs (11 September 1892 - 30 March 1974) was a Dutch male former water polo player. He was a member of the Netherlands men's national water polo team. He competed with the team at the 1920 Summer Olympics and 1924 Summer Olympics.

See also
 Netherlands men's Olympic water polo team records and statistics
 List of men's Olympic water polo tournament goalkeepers

References

External links
 

1892 births
1974 deaths
Dutch male water polo players
Water polo goalkeepers
Water polo players at the 1920 Summer Olympics
Water polo players at the 1924 Summer Olympics
Olympic water polo players of the Netherlands
Water polo players from Amsterdam
20th-century Dutch people